Jonathan James Ashton (born 4 October 1982) is an English former professional footballer who played as a defender. He is a first-team fitness coach at League One club Ipswich Town.

A product of Leicester City's youth academy, Ashton made seven Premier League appearances for the club during the 2001–02 season. During his time at Leicester, he was loaned out to Notts County and Oxford United to gain first-team experience. He joined Oxford on a permanent basis in September 2003 and played 103 matches for the club over three league seasons, before being released in May 2006. Ashton signed for Rushden & Diamonds ahead of the 2006–07 season, spending one season there before joining Essex club Grays Athletic on a free transfer in May 2007. He spent one-and-a-half years with Grays, during which he earned four caps for the England C team.

Ashton signed for fellow Conference Premier club Stevenage Borough for an undisclosed fee in January 2009. He made 234 appearances during his six years at Stevenage, helping the club earn back-to-back promotions from the Conference Premier to League One. Ashton left Stevenage in the summer of 2015 and joined Crawley Town of League Two. He then signed for National League club Braintree Town in July 2016, before returning to Grays Athletic on loan. Having initially joined Grays permanently ahead of the 2017–18 season, Ashton was offered a player-assistant manager contract at hometown club Nuneaton Town, which he signed in August 2017. The season proved to be Ashton's final season playing; as he returned to Stevenage as a fitness coach, before joining Ipswich Town performing the same role in May 2021.

Early life
He was born in Nuneaton, Warwickshire, and grew up in Whitestone, attending St Thomas More Catholic School.

Club career

Early career
Ashton started his career at Leicester City as part of the club's youth academy. He signed his first professional contract with Leicester in January 2001, and made his first-team debut in the Premier League in March 2002, playing the full match in a 2–0 defeat to Leeds United at Filbert Street. Ashton went on to play a further six matches towards the latter stages of the 2001–02 season. The club were relegated to the First Division that season and Ashton signed a new three-year contract on 31 May 2002. He started in the club's first match of the 2002–03 campaign, a 6–1 defeat against Ipswich Town at Portman Road. Ashton only played one further match for Leicester, before being loaned out to Notts County on a one-month loan agreement on 8 November 2002. A day after completing the loan move, he made his Notts County debut in a 2–2 draw against Mansfield Town, and played a further three games during his time there. On his return to Leicester, Ashton made one further appearance for the club, coming on as an 80th-minute substitute in the team's 1–1 draw with Norwich City on 27 April 2003. At the end of the season, Leicester made Ashton available for transfer.

Oxford United
Ashton joined Third Division club Oxford United on an initial one-month loan deal ahead of the start of the 2003–04 season, making his debut on the opening day of the season in a 1–0 victory against Lincoln City at Sincil Bank. After making seven appearances in all competitions during the first month of the season, with Oxford remaining unbeaten during that period, his move to the club was made permanent on 8 September 2003. He played regularly during the season, making 38 appearances, as Oxford finished the season in ninth position in Division Three. He continued to play regularly for Oxford throughout the 2004–05 season, making 31 appearances in all competitions, with Oxford finishing the season in a mid-table position. During the season, Ashton received the first red card of his career when he was sent-off after receiving two yellow cards in Oxford's 4–0 defeat to Southend United on 6 November 2004. Under the new management of Brian Talbot, Ashton played 34 games during the club's 2005–06 season, scoring his first goal for Oxford, and the first of his professional career, in a 1–1 draw with Rochdale on 4 February 2006. After being openly criticised by Talbot following a 2–1 defeat at Stockport County, Ashton made just one further appearance that season. In May 2006, he was released by new manager Jim Smith.

Rushden & Diamonds
A month after being released by Oxford, he signed for Conference National club Rushden & Diamonds, and made his debut on the opening day of the 2006–07 season in a 1–0 defeat to Crawley Town. He was a regular in central defence for Rushden throughout the season, and he scored his first goal in the club's 4–1 away victory against Tamworth on 12 September 2006. The goal was scored from the penalty spot late on in the second half to secure a comfortable victory. Despite playing regularly during his time there, Ashton was transfer-listed by new Rushden manager Garry Hill in April 2007, and was later told he was free to find a new club. He played 42 games for Rushden during his only season with the club, scoring twice.

Grays Athletic
A month later, he joined fellow Conference Premier club Grays Athletic on a free transfer, signing a two-year contract. Ashton made his Grays debut in a 0–0 draw away to recently relegated Torquay United on 12 August 2007, playing the whole match. Two weeks later, he scored his first goal for Grays in a 1–0 win against Altrincham, heading in Charley Hearn's left-wing cross to give Grays the lead in the second-half. He made 47 appearances in all competitions during a season in which Grays finished tenth in the Conference Premier standings. He was named as the Players' Player of The Year and Supporters' Player of The Year at Grays' end-of-season awards ceremony on 12 May 2008. He played a further 19 matches for Grays during the first half of the 2008–09 season, but was transfer-listed by Grays following discussions with the club in which the player stated he would not be staying at the club once his contract expired at the end of the season.

Stevenage
Ashton subsequently signed for fellow Conference Premier club Stevenage Borough for an undisclosed fee on 29 January 2009. The move reunited him with manager Graham Westley, who had previously managed Ashton during his time at Rushden & Diamonds. He made his Stevenage debut in a 1–0 victory over Woking at Broadhall Way on 24 February 2009. He made 13 appearances for the Hertfordshire club during the remainder of the 2008–09 season. The following season, Ashton scored his first goal for Stevenage in a 2–0 victory over Eastbourne Borough on 9 September 2009, scoring with a header from Joel Byrom's cross. He made 45 appearances in his first full season with Stevenage, scoring three times, as the club won the Conference Premier by 11 points, earning promotion into the Football League for the first time in their history. During the season, Ashton was a part of the defence that conceded just 24 goals in 44 games, keeping 27 clean sheets.

He played his first match of the 2010–11 season in Stevenage's first victory in the Football League, a 3–1 win over Stockport County on 21 August 2010. Similarly to the previous season, Stevenage's success was built on a tight defence, with the club keeping 19 clean sheets and conceding the fewest number of goals during the 2010–11 League Two season. He made 38 appearances for Stevenage that season, scoring once, as Stevenage earned promotion to League One in their first Football League season. At the end of the season, Ashton was voted Players' Player of the Year and Player of the Year. Ashton played in Stevenage's first League One fixture as Stevenage opened the 2011–12 season with a 0–0 home draw against Exeter City on 6 August 2011. He signed a new two-year contract with the club in September 2011. He made 53 appearances in all competitions, scoring once, as Stevenage were beaten in the League One play-off semi-finals after finishing sixth. Only league champions Charlton Athletic conceded fewer goals throughout the course of the season.

He remained at Stevenage for the 2012–13 season, with the club stating that they had rejected several transfer bids for him in the summer, along with fellow centre-back Mark Roberts, from Doncaster Rovers. Ashton made his first appearance of the new season in the club's 1–0 away victory over Leyton Orient on 21 August 2012, and played in eight further matches as Stevenage remained unbeaten in the league during the first two months of the season. He suffered an achilles injury during Stevenage's 2–2 draw with Bury at Broadhall Way on 29 September 2012, which turned out to be his final game of the season. Although he returned to first-team training in January 2013, he ruptured his achilles in a training session, ultimately ruling him out for the remainder of the season. Following the departure of manager Gary Smith in March 2013, Ashton was named as part of the club's coaching staff while the board appointed a new manager. At the end of the season, with Ashton's contract expiring in June 2013, he signed a new two-year deal with Stevenage, thus keeping him contracted to the club until the summer of 2015.

Ahead of the 2013–14 season, Ashton was appointed club captain following the departure of his predecessor, Mark Roberts. On appointing Ashton as captain, Stevenage manager Graham Westley described him as "the ideal man to lead our team forward. He has a great history at the club, he wins football matches and he leads men. As one fantastic captain departs, so another one is born. He symbolises the desire to succeed that is at the heart of Stevenage and his ambition is stronger than ever". He made 48 appearances in all competitions during the season, as Stevenage were relegated back to League Two after finishing in last place in the League One standings. He signed a new contract on 17 May 2014. Ashton played 21 times during the 2014–15 campaign, including an appearance in the League Two play-offs as Stevenage were unable to make an immediate return to League One after losing at the semi-final stage. He left Stevenage upon the expiry of his contract in July 2015. During his six years at Stevenage, Ashton made 234 appearances, which ranks him in ninth in the club's all-time appearance records.

Later career
Following his departure from Stevenage, Ashton joined League Two club Crawley Town on a one-year contract on 8 July 2015. He made his Crawley debut in a 1–1 draw with former club Oxford United on 8 August 2015. Ashton played 30 times as Crawley finished the season in 20th position in League Two. After his contract at Crawley expired, Ashton signed for National League club Braintree Town on 19 July 2016.

Having made 15 appearances for Braintree during the first half of the 2016–17 season, Ashton joined former club Grays Athletic on an initial one-month loan agreement on 25 January 2017. The loan was extended for a further month on 25 February 2017, and he went on to make nine appearances during the remainder of the loan spell. Ashton initially signed for the Isthmian League North club on a permanent basis on 8 July 2017. Despite signing for Grays, he was offered a role as player-assistant manager at Nuneaton Town of the National League North, his hometown club, and joined them on 2 August 2017. Ashton made 17 appearances for Nuneaton in the dual role before retiring from playing at the end of the season.

International career
Ashton was called up to the England C team, who represent England at non-League level, in May 2007, for the Four Nations Tournament in Scotland. He earned four caps at England C level, scoring once.

Coaching career
Following his retirement from playing, Ashton returned to Stevenage as the club's first-team fitness coach in June 2018. The move meant he was reunited with new Stevenage manager Dino Maamria, who he had been assistant manager to for the majority of the 2017–18 season at Nuneaton. He remained at Stevenage for three seasons before leaving to become first-team fitness coach at League One club Ipswich Town.

Personal life
Ashton was arrested with Danny Foster in May 2008, facing three counts of vandalism after the pair took down a number of advertising banners in Aviemore.

He is a qualified pilates instructor. He owns a pilates business after discovering its benefits during the latter stages of his playing career. He attributes it to "most definitely prolonging my career in football".

Career statistics

Honours
Stevenage
Conference Premier: 2009–10
FA Trophy runner-up: 2009–10
League Two play-offs: 2010–11

Individual
Stevenage Player of the Year: 2010–11

References

External links
 (to 2008–09)
 (from 2008 to 2009)

1982 births
Living people
Sportspeople from Nuneaton
English footballers
England semi-pro international footballers
Association football defenders
Leicester City F.C. players
Notts County F.C. players
Oxford United F.C. players
Rushden & Diamonds F.C. players
Grays Athletic F.C. players
Stevenage F.C. players
Crawley Town F.C. players
Braintree Town F.C. players
Nuneaton Borough F.C. players
Premier League players
English Football League players
National League (English football) players
Isthmian League players